The 1954–55 Oberliga  was the tenth season of the Oberliga, the first tier of the football league system in West Germany and the Saar Protectorate. The league operated in five regional divisions, Berlin, North, South, Southwest and West. The five league champions and the runners-up from the west, south, southwest and north then entered the 1955 German football championship which was won by Rot-Weiss Essen. It was Essen's sole national championship while, for losing finalist 1. FC Kaiserslautern, it was the fourth final it played in five seasons.

On the strength of this title Rot-Weiss Essen and 1. FC Saarbrücken, the best-placed Oberliga team from the Saar Protectorate, participated in the first edition of the European Cup, going out to Hibernian F.C. in the first round, as did Saarbrücken against A.C. Milan.

A similar-named league, the DDR-Oberliga, existed in East Germany, set at the first tier of the East German football league system. The 1954–55 DDR-Oberliga was won by SC Turbine Erfurt.

Oberliga Nord
The 1954–55 season saw two new clubs in the league, VfL Wolfsburg and VfB Oldenburg, both promoted from the Amateurliga. The league's top scorer was Günter Schlegel of Hamburger SV with 30 goals.

Oberliga Berlin
The 1954–55 season saw two new clubs in the league, Hertha BSC Berlin and BFC Südring, both promoted from the Amateurliga Berlin. The league's top scorer was Werner Nocht of Viktoria 89 Berlin with 18 goals.

Oberliga West
The 1954–55 season saw two new clubs in the league, Westfalia Herne and Duisburger SV, both promoted from the 2. Oberliga West. The league's top scorer was Heinz Lorenz of Preußen Dellbrück with 23 goals.

Oberliga Südwest
The 1954–55 season saw two new clubs in the league, Eintracht Bad Kreuznach and Sportfreunde Saarbrücken, both promoted from the 2. Oberliga Südwest. The league's top scorer was Herbert Martin of 1. FC Saarbrücken with 27 goals.

Oberliga Süd
The 1954–55 season saw two new clubs in the league, SSV Reutlingen and Schwaben Augsburg, both promoted from the 2. Oberliga Süd. The league's top scorer was Ernst-Otto Meyer of VfR Mannheim with 36 goals, a title he would take out twice more, in 1955–56 and 1958–59. Meyer was also the top scorer for all five Oberligas in 1954–55.

German championship

The 1955 German football championship was contested by the nine qualified Oberliga teams and won by Rot-Weiss Essen, defeating 1. FC Kaiserslautern in the final. The runners-up of the Oberligas, except Berlin, played pre-qualifying matches to determine which three of the four would go on to the group stage. The remaining eight clubs then played a home-and-away round of matches in two groups of four. The two group winners then advanced to the final.

Qualifying

First round

|}

|}
Replay

|}

Second round

|}

Group 1

Group 2

Final

|}

References

Sources
 30 Jahre Bundesliga  30th anniversary special, publisher: kicker Sportmagazin, published: 1993
 kicker-Almanach 1990  Yearbook of German football, publisher: kicker Sportmagazin, published: 1989, 
 DSFS Liga-Chronik seit 1945  publisher: DSFS, published: 2005
 100 Jahre Süddeutscher Fußball-Verband  100 Years of the Southern German Football Federation, publisher: SFV, published: 1997

External links
 The Oberligas on Fussballdaten.de 

1954-55
1
Ger
1955 in Saar